Klaus Serck-Hanssen (5 April 1886 – 28 August 1980) was a Norwegian engineer and mining executive.

Personal life 
Serck-Hanssen was born in Bergen, a son of physician and politician Klaus Hanssen and Dorothea Marstrand Serck. He married Gunvor Quenild in 1921. Among their children was Arne Serck-Hanssen (born 1925), a competitive sportsperson who participated at the 1948 Summer Olympics.

Career 
Serck-Hanssen graduated with a diplom degree in shipbuilding from the TH Charlottenburg in 1911. From 1912 he initiated a career in the mining industry. He was manager of the Vigsnes Copperworks at Karmøy from 1914 to 1920. From 1920 to 1938 he was assistant manager at the Orkla Mining Company. From 1939 to 1954 he managed the Skorovass Gruber in Skorovatn.

During the German occupation of Norway he was arrested by the Nazi authorities in April 1942, and held in the prison at Åkebergveien, at Møllergata 19 and the Grini concentration camp until the war ended. His son Arne was also held at Grini.

He died in August 1980 and was buried at Ris.

References 

1886 births
1980 deaths
Engineers from Bergen
20th-century Norwegian engineers
Norwegian businesspeople in mining
Technical University of Berlin alumni
Grini concentration camp survivors